Brian Lamar Prince (born March 24, 1964) is a member of the Georgia House of Representatives and a member of the Democratic Party representing district 127.

Prince serves on the Appropriations, Motor Vehicles, Special Rules, Transportation committees and the Special Committee on Access to Quality Health Care as a member. Prince serves as the Secretary of the Defense & Veterans Affairs Committee.

References

Democratic Party members of the Georgia House of Representatives
21st-century American politicians
Politicians from Augusta, Georgia
Living people
1964 births